Torta Bertolina, also known simply as Bertolina, is a typical autumnal dessert from the northern Italian town of Crema. It is presented in a round shape, but it is often available cut into slices. It has a golden brown hue and the fragrance of the small American or Concord grapes which are one of its main ingredients. The crust has an uneven texture with small holes in it. 
There are some variations especially when it is homemade, since many families have handed down the recipe through the generations; its exact origins are unknown, but the cake was probably made for the first time after the 1800s.

Ingredients 

 Flour
 Corn flour 
 Sugar 
 Icing sugar
 Butter
 Olive oil
 Eggs
 Vanilla
 Concord grapes
 Yeast

Bertolina Festival 
Every year, in September, the Bertolina Festival takes place in Crema in the main square, Piazza Duomo, where it is possible to taste the cake.

See also

 List of grape dishes
 List of Italian dishes

References
Prodotti Tipici

Cuisine of Lombardy
Grape dishes
Italian cakes